Australian children's musical group the Wiggles have released fifty-nine studio albums, three live albums, nine compilation albums, two extended plays, thirty-eight singles, two audiobooks, four karaoke albums, fourteen digital albums, two tribute albums, and thirteen other albums featuring solo group members or characters. Eighteen of the group's albums have been certified by the Australian Recording Industry Association (ARIA) as Gold, Platinum and double Platinum. Three of their albums have reached the top 10 on the ARIA Albums Chart.

The Wiggles (1991) was the original line-up's earliest album to be certified by ARIA, achieving Platinum status in 1995. Yummy Yummy (1994) achieved double Platinum status, certified in 2008. The album was also certified Gold in the US in 2004. Their next three releases, Big Red Car (1995), Wake Up Jeff! (1996) and Wiggly, Wiggly Christmas (1996) had also all received double Platinum certifications by 2008. Their eighth studio album, The Wiggles Movie Soundtrack (1997), which doubled as the soundtrack for the group's self-titled feature film, was the first to enter the ARIA Albums Chart, peaking at number 36 in November 1997. It was certified Platinum in 2008 along with Toot! Toot! (1998). An additional eight of the original quartet's albums attained Gold status.

The Wiggles returned to the charts with their new line-up, when Apples & Bananas (2014) charted at number 60. The group's fiftieth album, Nursery Rhymes 2 (2018), peaked at number 3, becoming their highest charting release while in its debut week, and the group's first top 10 album; the compilation album We're All Fruit Salad! The Wiggles' Greatest Hits (2021) also peaked at number 3. The Best of the Wiggles (2016) was the new line-up's first album to be certified, reaching Platinum in 2018, while Nursery Rhymes (2017) was accredited Gold in 2020. The group's cover of Tame Impala's "Elephant", which they performed on Triple J's Like a Version segment, became their first top 10 single, peaking at number 10 in January 2022 after it reached  1 on the annual Triple J Hottest 100 poll for 2021. The group's 2022 tribute album ReWiggled debuted at number one on the ARIA Albums Chart, becoming their first number-one album in Australia.

Albums

Studio albums

Live albums

Compilation albums

Audiobooks

Karaoke albums

Digital albums

Other albums

Tribute albums

Extended plays

Singles

Notes

References

Wiggles
Wiggles
The Wiggles albums